The 2022 season was the 110th season of competitive soccer in the United States.

National teams

Men's

Senior

.

Friendlies

2022 FIFA World Cup qualification

CONCACAF Third round

CONCACAF Nations League

Group D

FIFA World Cup

Group B

Knockout stage

Goalscorers
Goals are current as of December 3, 2022, after the match against .

U–20

CONCACAF U-20 Championship

Group E

Knockout stage

Women's

Senior

.

Friendlies

SheBelieves Cup

CONCACAF W Championship

Group A

Knockout stage

Final

Goalscorers
Goals are current as of November 13, 2022, after the match against .

U-20

2022 CONCACAF Women's U-20 Championship

Group E

Knockout stage

2022 Sud Ladies Cup

2022 FIFA U-20 Women's World Cup

Group D

U-17

CONCACAF Women's U-17 Championship

Group G

Knockout stage

FIFA U-17 Women's World Cup

Group A

Knockout

Club competitions

Men's

League competitions

Major League Soccer

Conference tables 

 Eastern Conference

 Western Conference

Overall 2022 table 
Note: the table below has no impact on playoff qualification and is used solely for determining host of the MLS Cup, certain CCL spots, the Supporters' Shield trophy, seeding in the 2023 Canadian Championship, and 2022 MLS draft. The conference tables are the sole determinant for teams qualifying for the playoffs.

MLS Playoffs 

Bracket

MLS Cup

MLS All-Star Game

USL Championship

Conference tables 
Eastern Conference

Western Conference

USL Championship Playoffs 

Bracket

USL Championship Final

USL League One

Playoffs

USL League One Final

USL League Two

USL League Two Playoffs

USL League Two Final

National Independent Soccer Association

East Division

West Division

Final Standings (Following August 27 Re-alignment)

Playoffs

2022 NISA Championship Final

MLS Next Pro

Eastern Conference

Western Conference

Overall table

Playoffs

2022 MLS Next Pro Cup

Cup competitions

US Open Cup

Final

International competitions

CONCACAF competitions

CONCACAF Champions League

Round of 16

|}
Quarter-finals

|}

Semi-finals

|}

Finals

|}

Leagues Cup Showcase

Campeones Cup

New York City FC will host the match on September 14, 2022, at Yankee Stadium.

Women's

League competitions

National Women's Soccer League

Regular season

Playoffs

Championship

United Women's Soccer

Cup competitions

Challenge Cup

Group
East Division

Central Division 

West Division

Ranking of second-placed teams

Championship

Honors

Professional

Amateur

References

Notes

External links
US Soccer Schedule
US Soccer Results
CONCACAF
MLS
NWSL
USL
USL1
NISA
MLS Next Pro

 
Seasons in American soccer
Soccer